Lake Town is a locality in South Dumdum of North 24 Parganas district in the Indian state of West Bengal. It is a part of the area covered by Kolkata Metropolitan Development Authority (KMDA).

Location 

Lake Town is surrounded by Bangur Avenue, Dum Dum Park and Kestopur in the north, Salt Lake in the east, Belgachia, Ultadanga in the South and Patipukur, Paikpara in the West. Kalidaha (Kalindi) is situated to the west of Lake Town, on the other side of Jessore Road.

The neighbourhood was developed in a planned manner after the Independence of India. Today, it is one of the important food and leisure hub in west Bengal having many international fast food chains and a shopping mall.

Notable residents
 Shanu Lahiri
 Ram kumar, painter
 Charu Chandra Khan, painter
 Sujit Bose

Real estate Boom 

A planned township with large open spaces, parks and a lake, Lake Town is one of the most sought-after residential areas of Northern fringes of Kolkata. Its proximity to Dumdum/Kolkata Airport and commercial centres like Salt Lake and New Town has been a catalyst for the rising property prices in recent years.

Some of Kolkata's prominent Real Estate firms have their presence in Lake Town.
 Ujaas - The Condoville by Bengal Ambuja
 Avani Oxford Phase I and II by Avani Group
 Alcove Gloria by Alcove Realty, an arm of Diamond Group
 Big Bazaar Family Centre - Kolkata's largest Big Bazaar, is a part of the locality

Transport 

Buses ply along Jessore Road, Lake Town Road and VIP Road in Lake Town. There is also Ultadanga Flyover which was inaugurated in 2011. The flyover connects EM Bypass (Bidhan Sishu Udyan, Ultadanga) with VIP Road (Dakshindari, Lake Town) and has reduced traffic jam at "Hudco More" of Ultadanga.

Bidhannagar Road railway station, Patipukur railway station, Kolkata Station and Dum Dum Junction are the nearest railway stations of Lake Town.

The Netaji Subhash Chandra Bose International Airport is at a distance of about 7 kilometres from Lake Town.

Kolkata Time Zone Tower
Standing on the VIP Road, the Kolkata Time Zone Tower is a one-third sized replica of Big Ben in Westminster, London. Completed in October 2015, the tower was conceived by Mamta Banerjee, the Chief Minister of West Bengal, with the intention of rivalling London as a financial centre. The project, headed by the South Dum Dum Municipality, cost Rs 1.36 crores (USD ) and was the subject of widespread local opposition, including a door-to-door petition, on the grounds of both cost and of cultural inappropriateness.

The tower is 30 metres in height, while Big Ben in London is 96 metres. It has ten floors and the four clock faces, sponsored by the Anglo Swiss Company, are each 3.6 metres in diameter, compared to 7 metres in the original.

References

Cities and towns in North 24 Parganas district
Neighbourhoods in North 24 Parganas district
Neighbourhoods in Kolkata
Kolkata Metropolitan Area